Robb Township is one of ten townships in Posey County, Indiana. As of the 2000 census, its population was 2,074.

History
Robb Township was organized in 1817. The township was named for the Robb family of pioneer settlers.

Towns
Poseyville

Unincorporated Places
Barrett
Stewartsville

References

External links
 Indiana Township Association
 United Township Association of Indiana

Townships in Posey County, Indiana
Townships in Indiana